Julie Ronnie (born March 21, 1963) is an American television actress. She is known for playing the role of Laken Lockridge in the American television soap opera Santa Barbara.

Ronnie was born in Torrance, California. Ronnie attended at Redondo Union High School, and was an exchange student in Japan. While at high school she started appearing in commercials. Ronnie began her career in 1984, playing the role of Laken Lockridge in Santa Barbara. Her final appearance on Santa Barbara was on September 12, 1985, after which she guest-starred on television programs including Dallas, The Love Boat, Trapper John, M.D., Hotel, T.J. Hooker, Matlock and Knight Rider.

In 1989, Ronnie joined the cast of the medical drama television series HeartBeat, in its second season.

References

External links 

Rotten Tomatoes profile

1963 births
Living people
People from Torrance, California
Actresses from California
American television actresses
American soap opera actresses
20th-century American actresses